Oberndorf may refer to the following places:

in Germany:
Oberndorf am Neckar, in the district of Rottweil, Baden-Württemberg
Oberndorf (Rottenburg), a suburb of Rottenburg am Neckar in the district of Tübingen, Baden-Württemberg
Oberndorf (Schweinfurt), a district of Schweinfurt
Oberndorf am Lech, in the district of Donau-Ries, Bavaria
Oberndorf, Lower Saxony, in the district of Cuxhaven, Lower Saxony
Oberndorf, Rhineland-Palatinate, in the Donnersbergkreis, Rhineland-Palatinate
in Austria:
Oberndorf an der Melk, in the district of Scheibbs, Lower Austria
Oberndorf bei Schwanenstadt, in the district of Vöcklabruck, Upper Austria
Oberndorf bei Salzburg, in the district of Salzburg-Umgebung, Salzburg
Oberndorf in Tirol, in the district of Kitzbühel, Tyrol